Ibrahim "Ibro" Zukanović (21 December 1957 – 19 October 2022) was a Bosnian professional football manager and player.

Career
As a player, Zukanović played for 13 years at hometown club Čelik Zenica in the Yugoslav First and Second League.

As a manager, he coached the Bosnia and Herzegovina U21 national team from 2002 until 2007. Zukanović also managed Sloga Uskoplje and lastly Iskra Bugojno.

Honours

Player
Čelik Zenica
Yugoslav Second League: 1978–79 (West), 1982–83 (West), 1984–85 (West)

References

External links
 EX YU Fudbalska Statistika po godinama Od 1974

1957 births
2022 deaths
Sportspeople from Zenica
Yugoslav footballers
Yugoslav First League players
Yugoslav Second League players
NK Čelik Zenica players
Association footballers not categorized by position
Bosnia and Herzegovina football managers
Bosnia and Herzegovina national under-21 football team managers
NK Iskra Bugojno managers